Selma Harrington née Arnautović is a Bosnian-Irish architect and designer. She holds a PhD Architecture from the University of Strathclyde and an MPhil European Studies from the Trinity College Dublin. She is an Executive Board member and Vice-President (2020-21) and served as President of the Architects' Council of Europe (ACE) (2010–11 and 2012–13).

Biography
Harrington was born and grew up in Sarajevo. She graduated architecture (1978) and received a master's degree (1985) at the University of Sarajevo  

Having practiced as architect, furniture and product designer in Sarajevo, she moved to Harare, Zimbabwe (1991), where she set up her own design firm specializing in interior architecture, design and refurbishment (1993–99). Over the years, she has completed projects in Europe, Africa and Asia in the areas of hotel and office interiors, residential and furniture design. Upon relocation to Dublin, Ireland, she developed a portfolio of conservation, renovation and retrofit design projects. In parallel, she developed an academic career by leading  a Master's programme in Interior Architecture and engaging in research. She is a Member of the Royal Institute of Architects in Ireland (RIAI) and a Head of Irish Delegation to the Architects Council of Europe (ACE).

Selma served as a secretary general of the European Council of Interior Architects (2004–08), a President of the Institute of Designers in Ireland (IDI) - 2003 and a Honorary Treasurer of the Institute for Design and Disability in Ireland (IDDI) in 2001.

External Links 

 “Executive Board: ACE.” Accessed October 19, 2021. https://www.ace-cae.eu/about-us/executiveboard/.
 International University of Sarajevo. “Selma Harrington from Griffith College Dublin Visited IUS,” October 22, 2015. https://news.ius.edu.ba/news/selma-harrington-griffith-college-dublin-visited-ius.
 Harrington, Selma. “Doing More With Less Architecture Education In Challenging Times,” 65,111,119.        Center for Mediterranean Architecture, Chania, 2011.
 https://www.ace-cae.eu/about-us/executive-board/
 https://orcid.org/0000-0002-2936-6482
 https://ulupubih.com/enterijer-dizajn/
 https://ecia.net/about-ecia/identity

References

1955 births
Living people
Architects from Sarajevo
Bosniaks of Bosnia and Herzegovina
Bosnia and Herzegovina women architects
Bosnia and Herzegovina emigrants to Ireland
Irish women architects
University of Sarajevo alumni